Jessie Laidlay Weston (28 December 1850 – 29 September 1928) was an English independent scholar, medievalist and folklorist, working mainly on mediaeval Arthurian texts.

Early life
Weston was the daughter of William Weston, a tea merchant and member of the Salters' Company, and his second wife, Sarah Burton, and named after his first wife Jessica Laidlay. Sarah, after giving birth to two more daughters died when Jessie was about seven. William remarried Clara King who gave birth to five more children. The elder siblings were born in Surrey, but youngest son Clarence was born in Kent. Jessie, her sister Frances and brother Clarence later moved to Bournemouth, where Jessie began her writing career, remaining there until around 1903. Her home at 65 Lansdowne Road still stands, as of 2010. Jessie studied in Hildesheim then Paris, France under Gaston Paris. She also studied at the Crystal Palace School of Art.

One of her first printed works was a lengthy sentimental verse called The Rose-Tree of Hildesheim. A narrative about "sacrifice and denial", it was modelled on the story of the Thousand-year Rose, which grows on a wall at Hildesheim Cathedral. Published in 1896, it was the title verse in an omnibus of her poems.

Career
Her best-known work is From Ritual to Romance (1920). In it she brought to bear an analysis harking back to James George Frazer on the Grail legend, arguing for origins earlier than the Christian or Celtic sources conventionally discussed at the time. It was cited by T. S. Eliot in his notes to The Waste Land (1922), and mentioned as one of two chief inspirations for the poem along with James Frazer's The Golden Bough. Eliot later said, in his lecture "The Frontiers of Criticism" (1956), that his original intention was merely to add the references he had employed, to counter earlier criticisms of his work as plagiarising. More extensive notes were requested by the publisher to bulk out the length of the poem in book form, and Eliot called them "bogus scholarship".

It also caused her to be dismissed as a theosophist by F. L. Lucas, in a hostile review of Eliot's poem. The interpretation of the Grail quest as mystical and connected to self-realisation, which she added to the anthropological layer of reading, was to become increasingly popular during the 1920s. According to Richard Barber in The Holy Grail: Imagination and Belief, the Wasteland as theme in the Grail romances is of minor importance until the last works of the cycle, and the emphasis on fertility is "an interpretation which has haunted twentieth-century literature to a degree quite disproportionate to its basis in fact". The book appears in the film Apocalypse Now amongst those kept by the character Kurtz, along with The Golden Bough, these being the two books Eliot cited as his chief inspirations for The Waste Land.

While Weston's work on the Grail theme has been derided as fanciful speculation in the years since the publication of From Ritual to Romance (even one-time supporter Roger Sherman Loomis eventually abandoned her hypothesis), her editions of numerous medieval romances have been commended as valuable translations.

A biography "In Quest of Jessie Weston" by Janet Grayson appears in Arthurian Literature, Vol. 11 (1992).

Works
Parzival: A Knightly Epic by Wolfram von Eschenbach (1894) (translator)
The Legends of the Wagner Drama: Studies in Mythology (1896)
The Legend Of Sir Gawain: studies upon its original scope & significance (1897)
Sir Gawain and the Green Knight : Retold in Modern Prose (1898)
King Arthur and His Knights: A Survey of Arthurian Romance (1899)
Guingamor, Lanval, Tyolet, Bisclaveret: Four Lais Rendered into English Prose (c. 1900) translator, text by Marie De France
Morien: a Metrical Romance Rendered into English Prose (1901) PDF
The Romance Cycle of Charlemagne and his Peers (1901)
Sir Cleges, Sir Libeaus Desconus (1902)
The Three Days' Tournament (1902)
The Legend of Sir Perceval: Studies upon its Origin, Development and Position in the Arthurian Cycle. London, David Nutt (1906). 2 volumes
Sir Gawain & the Lady of Lys. London, David Nutt (1907)
Old English Carols from the Hill MS. London, David Nutt (1911) (translator)
Romance Vision and Satire; English Alliterative Poems of the Fourteenth Century (1912)
The Quest for the Holy Grail (1913)
The Chief Middle English poets (1914)
From Ritual to Romance (1920)
The Romance of Perlesvaus (1988) edited by Janet Grayson

References

External links 

 
 
 
 

English folklorists
Women folklorists
Arthurian scholars
1850 births
1928 deaths
Holy Grail
19th-century English writers
19th-century English women writers
19th-century translators
20th-century English writers
20th-century English women writers
20th-century translators